Jennifer Brady was the defending champion, but chose not to participate.
Olga Govortsova won the title, defeating Amanda Anisimova in the final, 6–3, 4–6, 6–3.

Seeds

Draw

Finals

Top half

Bottom half

References
Main Draw

Revolution Technologies Pro Tennis Classic - Singles